On the afternoon of 18 January 2017, a major avalanche occurred on Gran Sasso d'Italia massif, one of the mountains above Rigopiano, impacting and destroying the four-star Hotel Rigopiano in Farindola, Abruzzo. The impact killed twenty-nine people and injured eleven others, making the avalanche the deadliest in Italy since the White Friday avalanches in 1916, and the deadliest avalanche in Europe since the Galtür avalanche in 1999.

Two causal factors for the avalanche of 2017 include a series of earthquakes that struck the region earlier in the day and the record snowfall which occurred in the region for days prior to the avalanche.

Avalanche 
It was reported that shortly after a series of earthquakes hit the region, many of the hotel guests were gathered on the ground floor of the hotel awaiting evacuation when the avalanche struck. At the time, there were forty people in the hotel including twenty-eight guests and twelve employees. Upon impact, the avalanche caused part of the roof of the hotel to collapse, and moved it  down the mountain. Italian authorities estimated that the avalanche weighed between 40,000 and 60,000 tonnes when it hit the hotel and that the weight of the snow increased to 120,000 tonnes as the snow and ice pressing down on the building became heavier.

The avalanche largely destroyed the four-star resort, killing twenty-nine people. A total of eleven people were rescued following the avalanche, including two people who survived the avalanche because they were standing outside the hotel when the avalanche hit. The survivors trapped inside the hotel, sheltered by lofts that had not collapsed, were located around 12:00 on 20 January, over 30 hours after the avalanche. 

Overall, five adults and four children trapped below the ruins and the snow were rescued, the last ones after 58 hours, having survived on frozen snow. Ten out of the eleven people rescued received minor injuries related to hypothermia. The eleventh person also received a compression injury to his upper arm, which he underwent surgery for. On 23 January, rescuers recovered a twelfth body, but also located three puppies alive under the snow, indicating that the twenty-two people missing may have still been alive. However, it was later revealed that no one else had survived the avalanche. One of the victims, as reported from a text message in her smartphone, survived over 40 hours.

Response 
Due to harsh conditions that inhibited helicopters from flying, first responders had difficulty reaching the hotel due to large amounts of snow which had fallen for several days prior to the accident. In addition, the presence of trunks and rubble on the streets slowed the snow blower, so that the first rescuers arrived at the scene at 04:30 local time (03:30 GMT)  on skis and stated that the hotel had been buried under at least  of snow, and that it could take days before they would know if there were any survivors. Individuals from emergency services, civil protection, alpine rescue and volunteers including asylum seekers worked with technology to track body heat, phone signals and other data, and drones to locate victims.

After two days of working emergency personnel made contact with six survivors in an air pocket of the destroyed hotel and managed to rescue them. Five days after the avalanche, three puppies from the hotel's resident dogs were found and rescued by workers, and reunited with their parents; Lupo (Wolf) and Nuvola (Cloud) who had escaped and found shelter in Farindola, a nearby village. Individuals saw the puppies as signs of hope, but officials warned that their survival did not mean that more human survivors would be found.

Controversy 

There was criticism over the amount of time it took emergency services to respond to the accident. A survivor who had remained outside the hotel following the avalanche called authorities for help, but allegedly Italian authorities did not at first believe that the accident had happened. Quintino Marcella, the owner of the restaurant L'Isola Felice in Silvi, received a call from the survivor and attempted to contact authorities on numerous occasions but was purportedly not taken seriously. On 23 January, local newspapers reported that prior to the avalanche, the owner of the hotel sent an email to local authorities expressing his concern for the hotel guests due to their panicky nature following the earthquakes. He stated that many hotel guests were planning on spending the night in their cars, out in the open.

Legal 
On 22 January, the mayor of Farindola, Ilario Lacchetta, announced that he was planning on filing a lawsuit against the satirical magazine Charlie Hebdo for publishing a cartoon allegedly mocking victims of the disaster. The cartoon depicts Death riding the avalanche down the mountain on skis holding two scythes instead of ski poles. Lacchetta stated that the cartoon "goes beyond bad taste," and was just as offensive as a similar satirical cartoon published by the same company, which mocked victims of the Amatrice earthquake in August 2016. 

Prosecutors launched a manslaughter investigation of the failure of authorities to respond to reports of an avalanche for many hours. In addition, an investigation was launched to determine whether Hotel Rigopiano was built on the debris of several previous avalanches which had taken a similar route down the mountain, therefore putting the hotel in danger.

On 31 January, Italian judges announced that autopsies revealed that almost all of the victims died immediately from the impact of the avalanche itself, rather than succumbing to hypothermia in the days following the disaster.

Memorials 
A year after the incident on January 18, 2018, victims relatives, local residents and representatives of the authorities and emergency services read prayers, poems and laid flowers outside the remains of the hotel during the Commemoration Day. There was also a display of those killed, with the words "Never Again" and photos of the victims.

A family of survivors, the Parete's wrote a book about their experience Il Peso Della Neve.

See also 
 List of avalanches by death toll
 2009 Schalfkogel avalanche, the deadliest avalanche in Austria since 2000
 2016 Geier avalanche, a deadly avalanche which struck Austria one year prior
 January 2017 European cold wave, a cold wave which is associated with record cold temperatures and snowfall which precipitated the avalanche
 Valfréjus avalanche, a deadly avalanche which struck France one year prior
 Winter of Terror, a series of deadly avalanches in Austria during the winter of 1950-51

References

External links

 CBS Survivors interview 60 Minutes

2017 disasters in Italy
January 2017 events in Italy
2010s avalanches
21st century in Abruzzo
Avalanches in Italy
Disasters in hotels
Disasters in Abruzzo
Farindola